Miklós Darvas (born 6 June 1949) is a Hungarian sprint canoer who competed in the 1970s. He won two medals in the C-1 500 m event at the ICF Canoe Sprint World Championships with a gold in 1973 and a silver in 1975.

Darvas also finished fifth in the C-2 1000 m event at the 1972 Summer Olympics in Munich.

References

Sports-reference.com profile

1949 births
Canoeists at the 1972 Summer Olympics
Hungarian male canoeists
Living people
Olympic canoeists of Hungary
ICF Canoe Sprint World Championships medalists in Canadian
20th-century Hungarian people